Alessandro Salvi (born 5 June 1988) is an Italian footballer. He plays for  club Cittadella.

Biography
Born in Bergamo, Lombardy, Salvi signed a youth contract with AlbinoLeffe in summer 2007 from local side of Treviolo, the Province of Bergamo. He then spent 2 seasons loaned to Lega Pro 2nd Divisione side Prato, which in the 2nd season joined along with Andrea Offredi. He made a break through that season, and eligible to sign a contract of maximum 5-year. (players which not yet reached the appearances criteria only able to sign a 3-year contract) On 29 July 2010, he signed a new 5-year contract with club along with Manuel Daffara and Enrico Geroni. On 13 July 2015, he joined Cittadella after the relegation of AlbinoLeffe.

He left Cittadella in 2018 to join Palermo, spending the 2018–19 Serie B with the Rosanero. After the club's exclusion from Italian football, he joined fellow Serie B club Frosinone.

On 5 August 2021, he signed a two-year contract with Ascoli.

On 6 January 2023, Salvi returned to Cittadella.

References

External links
 Football.it Profile 
 

1988 births
Footballers from Bergamo
Living people
Italian footballers
Association football midfielders
U.C. AlbinoLeffe players
A.C. Prato players
A.S. Cittadella players
Frosinone Calcio players
Ascoli Calcio 1898 F.C. players
Serie B players
Serie C players